is a Japanese, Kyoto-based electrical equipment company.
The company is a member of the Sumitomo Group and a partner of Sumitomo Electric Industries. As of 2015, Nissin Electric has 24 subsidiaries located in Japan, China, Taiwan, Korea, Thailand, Vietnam, India, U.S.A. and Spain.

Business segments and products

Power system equipment
Gas insulated switchgears
Capacitors
Transformers
Shunt reactors
Instrument transformers
Medium / low voltage metal enclosed equipment
Islanding protection device

Charged beam equipment and processing
Ion implanters
Electron beam processing systems
Thin-film coating service

Renewable energy and environment
Static VAR compensator
Voltage dip compensators for low voltage applications
Power conditioners for photovoltaic systems
Photovoltaic systems

Life cycle engineering
Installation, adjustment, inspection and maintenance services

References

External links 
 Official global website 

Engineering companies of Japan
Manufacturing companies based in Kyoto
Companies listed on the Tokyo Stock Exchange
Energy companies established in 1917
Manufacturing companies established in 1917
Japanese companies established in 1917
Electrical engineering companies of Japan
Japanese brands
Sumitomo Group